The Daily Journal is a newspaper in Park Hills, Missouri, United States.

It covers local news in the counties of St. Francois, Ste. Genevieve, Reynolds, Jefferson, Madison, Iron and Washington. The newspaper produces several weekly sections, including Community, Entertainment, Comics, and Sports. annual publications such as Best of the Parkland, many community oriented special sections, in addition to the Advantage which is a weekly advertisement publication published every Tuesday.

Dailyjournalonline.com, the online home of the Daily Journal, delivers news and information from many sources. The site receives an average of 1.8 million page views per month with over 122 thousand unique visitors. The paper is owned by Lee Enterprises, along with sister publications Democrat News and Farmington Press.

History
The Leadwood Press was founded on January 10, 1930, by Rev. S.M. Brumfield. In 1935, the paper was moved to Flat River. In 1940, it was published three times a week under the name the St Francois County Journal. On September 3rd, 1946, the St Francois County Daily Journal was published for the first time. Noah A. Grieg was a big part of the paper becoming a daily publication. Madison County's newspaper, the Democrat News, also ran in the area as well. Later on, the Democrat News was bought by Lee Enterprises and started running with the Daily Journal in the Fredericktown area.

References

External links

1930 establishments in Missouri
Daily newspapers published in the United States
Lee Enterprises publications
Newspapers published in Missouri
Newspapers established in 1930
St. Francois County, Missouri